Chow Chi-yuen (1900–1971) was a Hong Kong entrepreneur and the founder of Chow Tai Fook. He was the father-in-law of Cheng Yu-tung (鄭裕彤), chairman of New World Development, and was born in Shunde, Guangdong, China.

Chow set up his first "Chow Tai Fook" shop in Guangzhou (Canton) in 1929 to sell traditional gold accessories. In 1931, the shop was relocated to Macau during the Second Sino-Japanese War. In 1946, Chow established the first branch in Queen's Road Central, Hong Kong. In 1956, Cheng Yu-tung, Chow's son-in-law, took over Chow's business. Cheng expanded Chow Tai Fook's business to jewellery retailing in 1960.

References

External links
Chow Tai Fook Jewellery Group

1900 births
1971 deaths
Hong Kong businesspeople
Businesspeople from Guangdong
People from Foshan